KKNX (840 AM) is a classic hits radio station broadcasting to the Eugene, Oregon, area on 840 AM.

840 AM is a United States clear-channel frequency, on which WHAS in Louisville, Kentucky is the dominant Class A station.  KKNX must reduce nighttime power to protect the skywave signal of WHAS.

Translator
KKNX also broadcasts on the following FM translator:

References

External links

KNZ
Classic hits radio stations in the United States